The 2015 OEC Kaohsiung was a professional tennis tournament played on hard courts. It was the fourth edition of the tournament which was part of the 2015 ATP Challenger Tour. It took place in Kaohsiung, Taiwan between 21 and 27 September 2015.

Singles main-draw entrants

Seeds

 1 Rankings are as of September 14, 2015.

Other entrants
The following players received wildcards into the singles main draw:
  Jiří Veselý
  Yuki Bhambri
  Wang Chieh-fu
  Hung Jui-chen

The following players received entry with a protected ranking:
  Amir Weintraub

The following players received entry from the qualifying draw:
  Lee Kuan-yi
  Harry Bourchier
  Tatsuma Ito
  Yi Chu-huan

Champions

Singles

 Chung Hyeon def.  Yuki Bhambri, 7–5, 6–4

Doubles

 Hsieh Cheng-peng /  Yang Tsung-hua def.  Gong Maoxin /   Yin-Hsien Peng, 6–2, 6–2

References

External links
Official Website

OEC Kaohsiung
OEC Kaohsiung
2015 in Taiwanese tennis